The 2009–10 Liga Nacional de Hockey Hielo season was the 38th season of the top level of Spanish ice hockey.  The season began with the dispute of the Copa de la Federación (Federation Cup), a preparatory tournament which was won by CH Jaca. The regular season of the Liga Nacional began on 24 October and ended on 31 January.

Regular-Season Standings

Play-offs 

The playoffs were best-of-five series and started on February 6, ending on March 7 with the final victory of CH Jaca.

After the end of the championship was decided the champion of the Copa del Rey, the last tournament of the season, which was won by CG Puigcerdà.

External links
Federación Española de Deportes de Hielo

Spa
Liga Nacional de Hockey Hielo seasons
Liga